Cheat Codes is an American electronic music DJ trio. Consisting of KEVI (Kevin Ford / Prince$$ Rosie), Trevor Dahl, and Matthew Russell based in Los Angeles, the group is notable for their 2016 single "Sex", which samples the chorus from "Let's Talk About Sex" by Salt-N-Pepa, and their 2017 single "No Promises", which featured American popstar Demi Lovato and peaked within the top 40 of the US, UK and Australia. The track was certified Platinum by the RIAA.

History

2014–2015: Formation and debut singles
Prior to the 2014 formation of the trio, Trevor and Matt lived together and later wrote and recorded music with Kevin. Their name was inspired by Kevin's brother who told him that he had found the "cheat code" to getting anything he wanted in life. "We really embody the idea that anything is possible. To us, the real 'cheat code' to life is loving what you do and we hope to convey that energy through our music," they said in an interview.

In 2015, they released their debut single titled "Visions", which reached number one on the Hype Machine chart. It was followed by the singles "Don't Say No", "Senses", and "Adventure". "Adventure" reached number three on the Hype Machine chart. The group gained over 15 million views on YouTube and later toured with The Chainsmokers.

2016–present: Other singles, first EPs and Hellraisers 
In July 2016, they released "Let Me Hold You (Turn Me On)" with Dante Klein, which samples Kevin Lyttle's song "Turn Me On". The song has since gained over 100 million streams.

Before "Let Me Hold You (Turn Me On)" was released, In February 2016, they released "Sex" with Kris Kross Amsterdam, quickly gaining over 300 million streams. Talking about "Sex", band member Matt admitted that the song was affected by divine intervention as it only took 45 minutes to write. In August 2016, a music video was released for the song, and the trio performed at the Billboard Hot 100 festival.

They signed to 300 Entertainment in September 2016. In November, they released "Queen Elizabeth", co-produced by "Foreign Noi$e". They released "No Promises", a collaboration with Demi Lovato, in March 2017. In May 2017, the single "Stay With You" was released. The single "Sober" was released in July 2017. The group released "Feels Great", a collaboration with Fetty Wap and CVBZ, on October 13, 2017.

The group released the single "Put Me Back Together" with Kiiara on March 2, 2018. Cheat Codes collaborated with U2 and released a remixed version of U2's single "Love Is Bigger Than Anything in Its Way" on May 29, 2018.

In June 2018, they released their extended play, Level 1 consisting of 6 songs, include "I Love It" and "Balenciaga". On June 22, 2018, Cheat Codes released "Only You" with Little Mix as a part of the compilation album Love Island: The Pool Party, which was released on July 6, 2018, by Ministry of Sound. They released the song "Feeling of Falling" with Kim Petras on November 30, 2018. On July 26, 2019, they released their second extended play, Level 2.

On June 26, 2020, the group released the single "Heaven". The music video was released the following month. In August, they released "No Time" featuring Wiz Khalifa and DVBBS. On September 2, 2020, they announced their upcoming three-part debut studio album Hellraisers and released the lead single "Between Our Hearts" featuring Australian singer Cxloe. On November 4, they released the single "Washed Up".

Discography

Studio albums

Extended plays

Singles

As lead artist

As featured artist

Guest appearances

Remixes

References

Notes

Sources

External links
 

American electronic dance music groups
American dance music groups
Musical groups from California
Musical groups established in 2014
Remixers
American DJs
DJs from Los Angeles
American musical trios
Spinnin' Records artists
Sirius XM Radio programs
2014 establishments in California